Amanda is a 2009 romantic comedy directed by Steve Marra and starring Randy Ryan and Ariana Dubynin. The story takes place in Indianapolis, where movie was also shot. On October 4, 2009, it was released at the Louisville's International Festival of Film in the United States.

Premise 
Joe Bender (Randy Ryan) is a successful 40-year-old man. Joe meets his dream girl, Amanda (Ariana Dubynin), and he marries her. But when his new wife reveals a very deep, dark secret, Joe begins questioning the true meaning of love.

Production 
Production began on April 13, 2009. The budget was under $500,000.

Cast
 Ariana Dubynin - Amanda McNamara
 Randy Ryan - Joe Bender
Rest of cast listed alphabetically:
 Matthew W. Allen - Mr. McNamara's Driver
 Neil S. Bagadiong - Timid Man
 Bill Bannister - Bob Bender
 Tim Barrett - Park Mime
 Bruce Bennett - Elderly Man
 Tiffany Benedict Birkson - Woman Executive
 Tiffany Bullock - Escort date
 Mariah Daisy-Sharp - Little Katie
 China Doll - Ineeka
 Amy Esacove - Stacy
 Richard Hayes - Convenience store clerk
 Lynda Lansdell 411 operator

Reception 
Jenny Elig of Metromix wrote that the film "does its job well."

Amanda won best feature film at the 2010 Canada International Film Festival.

References

External links 
 
 
 Amanda at rottentomatoes.com

2009 films
2009 romantic comedy films
American independent films
American romantic comedy films
Films set in the 2000s
Films set in Indiana
Films shot in Indiana
2009 independent films
2000s English-language films
2000s American films